Cabbages and Kings is a Canadian panel discussion television program which aired on CBC Television in 1955.

Premise
This Vancouver-produced program featured topics such as broadcasting with radio host Jack Webster and lawyer Bill McConnell. Northrop Frye was featured on an episode about national reading habits. The topic of crime was discussed by McConnel, Roderick Haig-Brown and prison warden Hugh Christie. The show's moderator was Arthur Phelps.

Scheduling
This half-hour program was broadcast Wednesdays at 10:30 p.m. (Eastern) from 6 July to 27 September 1955.

References

External links
 

CBC Television original programming
1955 Canadian television series debuts
1955 Canadian television series endings
Television shows filmed in Vancouver